Sport Lisboa e Benfica "B", commonly known as Benfica B, is a Portuguese professional football team based in Seixal. Founded in 1999, dissolved in 2006, and restarted in 2012, it is the reserve team of Portuguese club S.L. Benfica. They play in the Liga Portugal 2, holding home matches at Benfica Campus' main pitch.

During the 2012–13 season, Benfica B played home matches at the Estádio da Luz until February, when they moved to Estádio da Tapadinha to prevent excessive wear of the stadium's grass. In 2013–14, they moved permanently to their own training ground, capable of receiving professional league matches.

As a reserve team, Benfica B cannot play in the same division as the club's main team, thus being ineligible for promotion to the Primeira Liga. Moreover, they cannot enter domestic cup competitions such as the Taça de Portugal and Taça da Liga. Since 2018–19, Benfica have an under-23 team playing in Liga Revelação.

History
As Benfica sought a way to provide playing time for their youth and reserve players, they created a B team in 1999. The team officially started competing in the 1999–2000 season, with their first match played away against Portimonense S.C. (2–2) in late August. After three seasons in the Portuguese Second Division, they suffered relegation to the Terceira Divisão, where they would spend three years, before achieving promotion to the Portuguese Second Division in 2005. In May of the following year, the board of directors extinguished the side, which returned to activity shortly after as part of the Liga Intercalar. As part of this competition, the team's best league finish was a second place, behind Estoril B, in the South Zone of the 2010–11 season.

Before the end of the 2011–12 football season in Portugal, seven Primeira Liga clubs announced their interest in creating a reserve team to fill the six vacancies available in the Segunda Liga (now Liga Portugal 2) for the 2012–13 campaign. Of those seven clubs, six were selected to take part in the competition: Benfica, Braga, Marítimo, Porto, Sporting CP and Vitória de Guimarães.

LPFP, who organize the professional football tiers in Portugal, announced that the clubs would have to pay €50,000 to register themselves at the league in order to compete in the upcoming season. In addition, LPFP also required them to follow new rules regarding player selection, in which each B team must have a squad with a minimum of ten players formed at the club's academy and with an age between 15 and 21 years, and a maximum of three players above 23 years old. LPFP also decided that reserve teams are unable to compete in cup competitions and to gain promotion to the Primeira Liga due to the possibility of playing against their club's first team.

In late May 2012, it was officially announced that the B teams of six Primeira Liga clubs would compete in the 2012–13 Segunda Liga, a decision that increased the number of teams from 16 to 22 and the number of matches from 30 to 42.

In 2014, Benfica B were invited to play in the first Premier League International Cup. On 29 May 2015, they played a friendly against F.C. United of Manchester in Broadhurst Park's official opening match. On 26 May 2019, they played a practice match against Liverpool in Marbella, Spain, five days before the latter's Champions League final.

Players

Current squad

Out on loan

Coaching staff
{| class="wikitable"
|-
! Position
! Name
|-
| Head coach
| Luís Castro
|-
| Assistant coaches
| Paulo LopesJorge Cordeiro
|-
| Goalkeeper coach
| Vítor Silva "Dimas"
|-
| Analyst coach
| Rúben Damázio
|-
| Analyst assistant coach
| João Francisco Silva
|-
| Personal trainers (Benfica LAB)
| Pedro BritoTiago Vaz

Records and statistics

Season-to-season record

Managerial statistics
As of match played 19 February 2023. Only competitive matches are counted, including those in the Premier League International Cup.

Honours
Terceira Divisão
 Winners: 2004–05

Notes

References

External links
  
 S.L. Benfica B at LPFP 

 
S.L. Benfica
1999 establishments in Portugal
Association football clubs established in 1999
Association football clubs disestablished in 2006
2012 establishments in Portugal
Association football clubs established in 2012
Portuguese reserve football teams
Liga Portugal 2 clubs
Premier League International Cup